Kalmati (also spelled as Kalamati) is a village in Cooch Behar district under Dinhata II block in West Bengal, India.

References

Villages in Cooch Behar district